The Tunisia men's national under-20 basketball team, nicknamed Les Aigles de Carthage (The Eagles of Carthage or The Carthage Eagles), is governed by the Tunisia Basketball Federation (FTBB). It represents the country in international under-21 and under-20 (under age 20) basketball competitions.

Competitive record
 Champions   Runners-up   Third place   Fourth place

Red border color indicates tournament was held on home soil.

FIBA Under-21 World Championship

FIBA Africa Under-20 Championship

See also
Tunisia national basketball team
Tunisia national under-19 basketball team
Tunisia national under-17 basketball team
Tunisia women's national under-20 basketball team

External links
Official website of the Tunisia Basketball Federation
FIBA Profile
 Archived records of Tunisia team participations
Afrobasket – Tunisian Men National Team U19/20

References

Men's national under-20 basketball teams
Men
Basketball